Sir William Edward Hercules Verner, 3rd Baronet (11 January 1855 – 8 June 1886) was a British baronet. He studied at Eton. From his father, he inherited Churchill estates in Ireland and a home at Eaton Square in London. He died at the age of 30 of cirrhosis of the liver without issue, although he had a stepson he cared for.

Early life
Verner was born the son of Sir William Verner, 2nd Baronet and his wife Mary Pakenham. He was baptised at home due to illness.

His early education is unknown, but it is theorised that he may have had a tutor as a child. From 1870 to 1872, Verner attended Eton College. His father died in 1873 and William was to inherit his father's estate when he married or turned 21 years of age. In the meantime, William's father's will provided for two residences for the boy known as "Billy" and his mother: one the Churchill house or mansion in Northern Ireland and the other at Eaton Square in London, where his mother liked to reside.

His guardian arranged for a "Grand Tour" that included China, Australia and America when he turned 18. He was accompanied by a man named Mr Greenslade.

Marriage and adult life
Billy met a woman and her son, Miss Annie Wilson and Harry, from Melbourne, Australia, and soon after turning 21, he married her on 29 January 1877. Annie was the daughter of John Wilson, Esquire of Melbourne, Australia. The family, though, "was not pleased" with the marriage. They entertained "lavishly" and travelled between their homes at Churchill and Eaton Square. Within 9 years of inheriting his father's estate, William took out a loan for £60,000.

Harry took the surname Verner, received a private education and attended Eton from 1882 to 1884.

He died at 30 years of age on 8 June 1886 of cirrhosis of the liver and was buried at Loughgall in Ireland. William mentioned his stepson in his will. There were no other children. Annie inherited his estate and died 2 years after her husband. They were interred in the same tomb.

Arms

See also
 Verner baronets

References

1855 births
1886 deaths
Baronets in the Baronetage of the United Kingdom
People educated at Eton College